The following are the national records in Olympic weightlifting in the United Arab Emirates. Records are maintained in each weight class for the snatch lift, clean and jerk lift, and the total for both lifts by the Emirates Weightlifting Federation.

Men

Women

References

United Arab Emirates
Olympic weightlifting
Records
Weightlifting